Telecommunications Tower may refer to:

 Telecommunications tower, a mast or tower built primarily to hold telecommunications antennas
 Telecommunications Tower (Montevideo), or Antel tower, in Uruguay
 Telecommunication Tower of US-Forces Heidelberg, in Germany
 Telecom Telecommunication Tower Heidelberg, in Germany
 Bungsberg telecommunications tower, in Germany
 Lohmar-Birk telecommunications tower, in Germany

See also

 Telekom Tower, in Kuala Lumpur, Malaysia
 Montjuïc Communications Tower, in Spain
 Liberation Tower (Kuwait), originally intended to be named The Kuwait Telecommunications Tower
 Pasilan linkkitorni, or Yle Transmission Tower, in Finland